Alexandre Luiz Reame (born 23 February 1988), better known as Xandão, is a Brazilian former footballer who played as a centre back.

Career
On 10 December 2009 São Paulo FC signed the defender from Desportivo Brasil. Xandão scored his first goal for Sporting CP in the UEFA Europa League against Manchester City in the 51st minute by a backheel from five yards.

On February 15, 2013, Xandão terminated his loan with Sporting and was bought by Kuban Krasnodar.

On 17 August 2016, Xandão  signed a three-year contract with Anzhi Makhachkala.

On August 30, 2019, Xandão signed a one-year contract with Persija Jakarta

Career statistics

References

External links

 

1988 births
Living people
People from Araçatuba
Brazilian footballers
Brazilian expatriate footballers
Brazilian expatriate sportspeople in Spain
Brazilian people of Algerian descent
Campeonato Brasileiro Série A players
Primeira Liga players
Russian Premier League players
Fluminense FC players
Club Athletico Paranaense players
Guarani FC players
Grêmio Barueri Futebol players
Desportivo Brasil players
São Paulo FC players
Sporting CP footballers
FC Kuban Krasnodar players
Expatriate footballers in Portugal
Expatriate footballers in Russia
FC Anzhi Makhachkala players
Association football defenders
Footballers from São Paulo (state)